The 2011–12 season was Al Ain Sports and Cultural Club's 36th consecutive season in Pro-League. Al Ain started the season with a new board of directors, after the former board of directors resigned following the 2010–11 season, one of the worst in the club's history.

Season overview

Pre-season
On June 6, Al Ain announced officially Cosmin Olaroiu as the new manager for two seasons and released all the foreign players. After only one day of contracted with Cosmin Olaroiu, Al Ain reaching an agreement with AEK Athens for Argentine Ignacio Scocco according to reports a value of €3 million.

August
On 8 August, Al Hilal announced on his official website an agreement to loan Saudi international Forward Yasser Al Qahtani to Al Ain for  one-year at a cost of €2.5 million.

On 13 August, At the opening of Al Ain Football International Championship, Al Ain S.C.C. launched the new logo for the club.

Club

Technical staff
{| class="wikitable"
|-
! style="color:#FFFFFF; background: #7300E6; border:2px solid #AB9767;"|Position
! style="color:#FFFFFF; background: #7300E6; border:2px solid #AB9767;"|Staff
|-

  Massimo Pedrazzini

Board of directors

Disciplinary record

|-

Assists
{| class="wikitable" style="font-size: 100%; text-align: center;"
|-
!width=20|
!width=20|
!width=20|
!width=200|Player
!width=50|League
!width=50|League Cup
!width=50|President's Cup
!width=50|Champions League
!width=50|Super Cup
!width=50|Total
|-
|1
|6
|MF
|align="left"| Mirel Rădoi
|||4||||||||4
|-
|2
|32
|FW
|align="left"| Ignacio Scocco
|||2||||||||2
|-
|—	
|11
|FW
|align="left"| Abdulaziz Fayez
|||2||||||||2
|-
|—	
|44
|DF
|align="left"| Fares Jumaa
|||1||1||||||2
|-
|5
|16
|MF
|align="left"| Mohamed Abdulrahman
|||||1||||||1
|-
|—	
|3
|FW
|align="left"| Asamoah Gyan
|||||1||||||1
|-
|—	
|19
|DF
|align="left"| Mohanad Salem
|||||1||||||1
|-
|—	
|9
|FW
|align="left"| Yasser Al-Qahtani
|||1||||||||1
|-
|—	
|13
|MF
|align="left"| Rami Yaslam
|||1||||||||1
|-
|colspan="4"|TOTALS
|||11||4||||||15

Goalscorers
{| class="wikitable" style="font-size: 100%; text-align: center;"
|-
!width=20|
!width=20|
!width=20|
!width=200|Player
!width=50|League
!width=90|League Cup
!width=120|President's Cup
!width=50|Total
|-
|1
|3
|FW
|align="left"|  Asamoah Gyan
|22||3||2||27
|-
|2
|9
|FW
|align="left"| Yasser Al-Qahtani
|7||5||||12
|-
|3
|32
|FW
|align="left"| Ignacio Scocco
|9||2||||11
|-
|4
|5
|DF
|align="left"| Ismail Ahmed
|3||1||||4
|-
|—
|8
|MF
|align="left"| Mohammed Al Saadi
|1||3||||4
|-
|6
|6
|MF
|align="left"| Mirel Radoi
|||3||||3
|-
|—
|28
|FW
|align="left"| Mohamed Naser
|3||||||3
|-
|8
|10
|MF
|align="left"| Omar Abdulrahman
|2||||||2
|-
|—
|11
|FW
|align="left"| Abdulaziz Fayez
|2||||||2
|-
|—
|7
|MF
|align="left"| Ali Al-Wehaibi
|2||||||2
|-
|11
|19
|DF
|align="left"| Mohanad Salem
|||||1||1
|-
|—
|21
|DF
|align="left"| Fawzi Fayez
|1||||||1
|-
|—
|16
|FW
|align="left"| Mohamed Abdulrahman
|||||1||1
|-
|colspan="4"|Own Goals
|||||1||1
|-
|colspan="4"|TOTALS
|52||17||5||74

Hat-tricks

(H) – Home; (A) – Away

Clean sheets
{| class=wikitable 
|-
!Rank
!Player
!Clean sheets 
|-
|align=center|1
|align=left| Dawoud Sulaiman
|rowspan=1 align="center" |7
|-
|align=center|2
|align=left| Waleed Salem
|rowspan=1 align="center" |5
|-
|colspan="2" align="center"|TOTALS
|align=center|12

Awards

References

External links
 Al Ain FC official website

Emirati football clubs 2011–12 seasons
2011-12